WTTL (1310 AM, "Classic Hits 103.5") is a radio station broadcasting a classic hits format. Licensed to Madisonville, Kentucky, United States.  The station is currently owned by Madisonville CBC, Inc.

On December 20, 2016, WTTL changed their format from ESPN sports to classic hits, branded as "Classic Hits 103.5 (simulcast on FM translator W278CK 103.5 FM Madisonville).

References

External links

TTL